Oksana Ilyinichna Fabrichnova (born November 24, 1978 in Moscow, Russia) is a former artistic gymnast. In 1993, she finished first in the all-around at the European Cup and fifth in the all-around at the 1993 World Championships. At the 1994 World Team Championships, Fabrichnova won the bronze medal on balance beam and helped Russia win the bronze medal in the team competition. She was an alternate for Russia at the 1996 Summer Olympics.

After retiring from gymnastics, Fabrichnova performed in a circus and then became a doctor. She is married to Dmitry Kolozin, and the couple has one daughter, Irina.

Eponymous skill
Fabrichnova has one eponymous uneven bars dismount listed in the Code of Points.

Competitive history

References

Living people
Russian female artistic gymnasts
Medalists at the World Artistic Gymnastics Championships
Originators of elements in artistic gymnastics
Goodwill Games medalists in gymnastics
Competitors at the 1994 Goodwill Games
1978 births